Songklanagarind Hospital is a university teaching hospital, affiliated to the Faculty of Medicine of Prince of Songkla University, located in Hat Yai District, Songkhla Province. It is a hospital capable of super tertiary care and is the first university hospital in Southern Thailand.

History 
On 26 August 1976, King Bhumibol Adulyadej and Queen Sirikit laid the foundation for the construction of the faculty's main teaching hospital, which was to be constructed for the following purposes:
 Use as a clinical training hospital for doctors, nurses and healthcare personnel
 Provide medical care, both prevention and cure to citizens in Southern Thailand
 Provide special equipment for patient diagnosis in the hospital and nearby hospitals
 Use as a research center to improve the healthcare in Southern Thailand
Ten years later on 18 September 1986, the King and Princess Sirindhorn opened the hospital and named it 'Songklanagarind' Hospital. Songklanagarind Hospital has become the main teaching hospital since then.

The current hospital director is Assoc. Prof. Rueangsak Leethanaporn, M.D.

As a university hospital, it is generally regarded as one of the final referral centers for complicated and rare diseases from all hospitals, especially within Southern Thailand.

Facilities 
The hospital has selected medical specialities in which the hospital has the professional staff capable of providing excellent service in that field. Six medical centers have been established so citizens in the South do not have to go to other institutions for receive the treatment. These are the following:
 Naradhiwas Rajanagarindra Heart Center
 Nanthana-Kriangkrai Chotiwattanaphan (NKC) Center of Gastroenterology and Hepatology
 Cancer Center
 Trauma Center
 Medical Information Center
 Palliative Care Unit

See also 
Healthcare in Thailand
 Hospitals in Thailand
 List of hospitals in Thailand

References 

 Article incorporates material from the corresponding article in the Thai Wikipedia

Hospitals in Thailand
Hospitals established in 1986
Buildings and structures in Songkhla province
Teaching hospitals in Thailand